Caleana major, commonly known as the large duck orchid, is a small orchid found in eastern and southern Australia. This terrestrial plant features a remarkable flower, resembling a duck in flight. The flower is an attractant to insects, such as male sawflies which pollinate the flower in a process known as pseudocopulation. In 1986 this orchid was featured on an Australian postage stamp.

Description
(In rare cases, the flower can be greenish with dark spots.) The column has broad wings which the dorsal sepal and petals almost touch and the lateral sepals turn back wing-like behind the flower. Flowering occurs from September to January.

Taxonomy and naming
Caleana major was first formally described in 1810 by Robert Brown from a specimen he collected at Port Jackson, Bennelong Point in September 1803. The description was published in Prodromus Florae Novae Hollandiae et Insulae Van Diemen. The genus name (Caleana) honours George Caley, an early botanical collector and the specific epithet (major) is a Latin word meaning "large" or "great".

Distribution and habitat
The flying duck orchid occurs in Queensland, New South Wales, Victoria, South Australia and Tasmania, growing in eucalyptus woodland, coastal or swampy shrubland and heathland. Mostly near the coast, but occasionally at higher altitudes.

Ecology
The plant is pollinated by insects. The labellum is held above the flower by a sensitive strap-like stalk. When touched, the labellum turns rapidly downward, trapping a visiting insect between the labellum and column wings.

Cultivation
Caleana major has been difficult to maintain in cultivation. Plants flower for one or sometimes two years but progressively weaken until they die.

References

External links

major
Endemic orchids of Australia
Orchids of New South Wales
Orchids of South Australia
Orchids of Victoria (Australia)
Orchids of Tasmania
Orchids of Queensland
Taxa named by Robert Brown (botanist, born 1773)